Wilhelm Daniel Joseph Koch (5 March 1771 – 14 November 1849) was a German physician and botanist from Kusel, a town in the Rhineland-Palatinate.

Koch studied medicine at the Universities of Jena and Marburg, and afterwards was a Stadtphysicus (state physician) in Trarbach and Kaiserslautern (1798). In 1824 he became a professor of medicine and botany at the University of Erlangen, where he stayed for the remainder of his life. At Erlangen, he was also director of the botanical gardens. In 1833, he was elected a foreign member of the Royal Swedish Academy of Sciences.

Among his better written efforts was a synopsis on German and Swiss flora titled Synopsis florae germanicae et helveticae (1835–37). Another noteworthy publication of his was Catalogus plantarum, quae in ditione Florae Palatinatus (Catalog of Palatinate flora) (1814).

He died in Erlangen.

He has been honoured in the naming of 2 plant genera; Eokochia (from the family Amaranthaceae), and Kochia (Chenopodioideae).

References 

 This article is based on a translation of an article from the German Wikipedia, namely: Wikisource, Wilhelm Koch (Allgemeine Deutsche Biographie).

German taxonomists
1771 births
1849 deaths
Members of the Royal Swedish Academy of Sciences
Academic staff of the University of Erlangen-Nuremberg
18th-century German botanists
18th-century German physicians
19th-century German writers
19th-century German male writers
19th-century German botanists
19th-century German physicians
People from Kusel (district)
Members of the Royal Society of Sciences in Uppsala